Steve or Steven Russell may refer to:

 Steve Russell (politician) (born 1963), American politician in Oklahoma
 Steve Russell (computer scientist) (born 1937), American computer scientist
 Steve Russell (writer), Cherokee journalist and academic
 Steve Russell (cricketer) (born 1968), Australian cricketer
 Steven Jay Russell (born 1957), American con artist
 Steve Russell, member of R&B group Troop

See also
Stephen Russell (disambiguation)